Dickey Peak may refer to:

Dickey Peak, a mountain in the Ellsworth Mountains, Antarctica
Dickey Peak (Idaho), a mountain in Custer County, Idaho